Kowalówka may refer to the following places:
Kowalówka, Łódź Voivodeship (central Poland)
Kowalówka, Masovian Voivodeship (east-central Poland)
Kowalówka, Subcarpathian Voivodeship (south-east Poland)